This is a list of heads of state of Algeria since the formation of the Provisional Government of the Algerian Republic (GPRA) in exile in Cairo, Egypt in 1958 during the Algerian War, through independence in 1962, to the present day.

A total of five people have served as President of Algeria (not counting two Presidents of the GPRA and four interim heads of state). Additionally, two persons, Houari Boumédiène and Liamine Zéroual, have served both as interim head of state and as President of Algeria.

Key
Political parties

Other factions

Status

List

For details of the post of President of Algeria see: President of Algeria

Timeline

See also
Algeria
List of French governors of Algeria
President of Algeria
Prime Minister of Algeria
List of heads of government of Algeria
Lists of office-holders

Notes

External links
 World Statesmen – Algeria

Government of Algeria
Algeria
Heads of state